Médico de guardia ("Doctor on Call") is a 1950 Mexican film. It was produced by 
Fernando de Fuentes.

Cast
 Armando Calvo - El Director de Hospital (Dr. Enrique Méndez)
 Lilia del Valle - La Jefa de Enfermeras (Beatriz Lozano)
 Luis Beristáin - El Investigador (Dr. Jaime Prieto)
 Josefina Escobedo - La Doctora (Doctora Yáñez)
 Armando Sáenz - El Practicante (Ruiz)
 Juan Carlos Calvo - El Padre sin hijos (Señor Hinojosa)
 Patricia Morán - La Moribunda (Carmen Rosado)
 Miguel Ángel López is disamb - El Torero (Lalo)
 Queta Lavat - La Enfermera (Irene) 
 Felipe Montoya - El Médico de Comisaría (Dr. Sevilla)
 Enrique Díaz 'Indiano' - El Droguista (Sr. Bermúdez)
 Irma Dorantes - La Seducida (Magdalena Orozco) 
 Rafael Estrada - El Seductor (Ricardo)
 Mimí Derba - La Madre (doña Carmen, madre de Jaime)
 Carolina Barret

External links
 

1950 films
1950s Spanish-language films
Mexican drama films
1950 drama films
Mexican black-and-white films
1950s Mexican films